The Southern Intercollegiate Athletic Association (SIAA) was one of the earliest collegiate athletic conferences, formed in December 1894.  Though many of its earliest schools departed in the 1920s to form the Southern Conference, and later the Southeastern Conference and Atlantic Coast Conference, it existed until 1942.  The first post-season college conference basketball tournament was staged in 1921 by the SIAA. In 1922 and 1923, the SIAA and SoCon shared a common tournament. Western Kentucky under Edgar Diddle won the last 6 tournaments, with 3 led by center Carlisle Towery.  In 1947 there was an attempt, led by Western Kentucky, to revive the SIAA.  Western Kentucky hosted an SIAA basketball tournament that turned out to be little more than an invitational tournament because most former SIAA members declined to participate.

Champions by year
This is an incomplete list of champions of the SIAA.

Post SoCon

Revival

References

Champions
Southern Intercollegiate Athletic Association